The Grecian bend was a term applied first to a stooped posture which became fashionable c. 1820, named after the gracefully-inclined figures seen in the art of ancient Greece.  It was also the name of a dance move introduced to polite society in America just before the American Civil War. The "bend" was considered very daring at the time.

The stoop or the silhouette created by the fashion in women's dress for corsets, crinolettes and bustles by 1869 was also called the Grecian bend. Contemporary illustrations often show a woman with a large bustle and a very small parasol, bending forward.

The term was also given to those who suffered from decompression sickness, or "the bends", due to working in caissons during the building of the Brooklyn Bridge in New York City. The name was given because afflicted individuals characteristically arched their backs in the same manner as the then popular "Grecian bend" fashion.

Appearance in popular music
There were many songs published with "Grecian Bend" in their titles.  The term "Grecian bend" appears in the song "The Garden Where The Praties Grow" by Johnny Patterson:

Notes

External links
 
History of clothing (Western fashion)